Open Source Media Framework (OSMF) is a free, open-source, development framework for building video experiences on the web and desktop. OSMF is a pure ActionScript 3.0based framework and is created by Adobe Systems.

OSMF is designed for content publishers, developers, and Adobe Flash platform ecosystem partners—anyone who is incorporating video on their website. OSMF simplifies development by providing out-of-the-box support for multiple media types, including video, audio, images, and SWF files. The extensible plug-in architecture enables additional features from third-party services, such as advertising insertion, rendering, tracking, reporting for analytics, and content delivery network (CDN) authentication.

OSMF supports RTMP and HTTP streaming, progressive download, sequential and parallel compositions of video and other media, and layout in and outside the video player.

See also
Adobe Flash Player
Adobe Media Player
JW Player

References

External links
 
 Strobe Media Playback
 
 
 
 
 
 

Adobe Inc.
Media players